Lochovice is a municipality and village in Beroun District in the Central Bohemian Region of the Czech Republic. It has about 1,300 inhabitants.

Administrative parts
Villages of Kočvary, Netolice and Obora are administrative parts of Lochovice.

Notable people
Josef Fiala (1748–1816), composer, multi-instrumentalist
Václav Hrabě (1940–1965), poet; buried here

References

Villages in the Beroun District